Vaibhav Singh Yadav (Vaibhav Yadav) is a professional Boxer from India known as Ahir Boxer in professional boxing circuit. He's from national Capital New Delhi. He became World Boxing Council (WBC) Asia silver welterweight champion after defeating Thailand's Fahpetch Singmanassak in 2019.

Career

Vaibhav Singh Yadav aka Ahir Boxer is the first Indian unified titles champion holder. He won the fight against Thailand's boxer Phongsathon Sompol by the 3rd-round knockout stoppage.

Vaibhav Singh Yadav became first ever professional boxer from India who fought in Massachusetts, USA and won his American debut against William Parra Smith.

Performance in Pro Boxing

 World Boxing Council (WBC) Asia silver title holder 2019
 ABF title holder 2019
 World Boxing Council (WBC) Asia silver title holder 2020
 ABF titles holder 2020

Total Numbers of Pro Fights

 Won -10
 Loss -2
 Knockouts -7
 Draw -0

References

External links
 
 BoxRanking
 Vaibhav Singh Yadav at Twitter

Living people
Indian male boxers
Welterweight boxers
1995 births